Walter Jupé (6 April 1916 – 16 November 1985) was a German actor, screenwriter and dramaturg.

Life 
After his acting training with Helene Lackner, Jupé made his debut 1943 on a stage in Oldenburg, played then in Weimar, before shifting to Maxim-Gorki-Theater in East-Berlin, where he acted until 1982. Aside from his stage activity, Jupé also started a film and television career at the DEFA and Television of the GDR (DFF) in the middle of the 1950s. Here he often played bad characters in historic flicks like in the telefilm The Heyde-Sawade Affair (1963). But in addition he also acted in cheerful subjects and contemporary flicks.

Together with writer Friedrich Karl Kaul he wrote more than 40 episodes of the thriller-like Fernsehpitavale (television pitavals), where historic criminal cases were cleared. Jupé shines in this successful television series of the DFF as writer and main actor. Later some episodes were realised as motion pictures like Lebende Ware (1966) or Der Mord, der nie verjährt (1967).

Selected filmography 
 Geheimakten Solvay (1952)
 Gefährliche Fracht (1954)
 Ernst Thälmann – Leader of his Class (1955)
 Thomas Muentzer (1956)
 Bärenburger Schnurre (1957)
 Senta auf Abwegen (1959)
 Goods for Catalonia (1959)
 Guten Tag, lieber Tag (1960)
 Das hölzerne Kälbchen (1961)
 A Lively Christmas Eve (1962)
 Monolog für einen Taxifahrer (1962/1990, telefilm)
 The Heyde-Sawade Affair (1963, telefilm)
 The Rabbit Is Me (1965)
 Dr. Schlüter (1965, television series)
 Solange Leben in mir ist (1965)
 Trace of Stones (1966)
 Lebende Ware (1966) 
 Heroin (1968)
 Ich – Axel Cäsar Springer (1968–1970, television series)
 Hans Beimler Kamerad (1969, telefilm)
 Trotz alledem! (1972)
 Die Bilder des Zeugen Schattmann (1972, television series)
 Das Geheimnis der Anden (1972, television series)
 Jenny (1975, telefilm)
 Des Doktors Dilemma (1976, telefilm)
 Unser Mann ist König (1980, television series)
 Melanie van der Straaten (1982, telefilm)
 Die Gerechten von Kummerow (1982)
 Drei Schwestern (1983, telefilm)
 Wie die Alten sungen… (1987)

External links 
 

1916 births
1985 deaths
Male actors from Berlin
German male dramatists and playwrights
German male film actors
German male stage actors
German male television actors
20th-century German male actors
20th-century German dramatists and playwrights
German male screenwriters
Recipients of the National Prize of East Germany
Recipients of the Patriotic Order of Merit
20th-century German male writers
German male radio actors
East German actors
Film people from Berlin
20th-century German screenwriters